They Never Saw Me Coming is the debut album by TQ released on November 10, 1998 in the United States and May 8, 1999 in the United Kingdom.

History

Background
TQ wrote every word on They Never Saw Me Coming, with production handled by Mike Mosley of Steady Mobbin Productions. Mosley's outstanding studio work with such artists as Tupac Shakur and E-40 speaks for itself. "Mike and I really like and respect each other," TQ acknowledged. "He's very serious about his work, like I am. By motivating each other, we both gave my project 110 percent."

"Bye Bye Baby", a Mosley/Ty Howard produced track, is based on a true story about a woman shot by a drive-by bullet meant for her man; it's followed by "The Comeback", a soul-searing track detailing the violent revenge wreaked on the shooter. "Darling Mary" is a playful ode to urban life's blunted reality; "When I Get Out", a pulsating ballad between TQ and Ericka Yancey, about an incarcerated brother's insecurity when it comes to his lover on the outside.

A horrifying drug-related incident from TQ's past was the source of "Remember Melinda"; "Gotta Make That Money" is a contemporary hustlers theme song, featuring a guest rap by E-40. "The bottom line," TQ states, "is that this album is about my life, the lives of the people that are close to me, and those that influenced me."

Singles

Track listing

Charts

Weekly charts

Year-end charts

References

1998 debut albums
TQ (singer) albums
Albums produced by Jazze Pha